Long Distance Calling may refer to:

Long-distance calling
Long Distance Calling (band), a German band
Long Distance Calling (album), a 2011 self-titled album from the band